A milecastle was a small fort (fortlet), a rectangular fortification built during the period of the Roman Empire. They were placed at intervals of approximately one Roman mile along several major frontiers, for example Hadrian's Wall in Great Britain (Britannia in the Roman period), hence the name.

Along Hadrian's Wall, milecastles were initially constructed of stone in the eastern two thirds, and stacked turf with a wooden palisade in the western third, though the turf milecastles were later rebuilt in stone. Size varied, but in general they were about 15m by 18m (50 feet by 65 feet) internally, with stone walls as much as 3m (10 feet) thick and probably 5m to 6m (17 to 20 feet) high, to match the height of the adjacent wall. There were 80 milecastles and 158 turrets.

On Hadrian's Wall, a milecastle (there are a few exceptions) guarded a gateway through the Wall with a corresponding causeway across the Wall ditch to the north, and had a garrison of perhaps 20–30 auxiliary soldiers housed in two barrack blocks. On either side of the milecastle was a stone tower (turret), located about one-third of a Roman mile (500m or 540 yards) away. It is assumed that the garrison also supplied soldiers to man the turrets. The milecastle's garrison controlled the passage of people, goods and livestock across the frontier, and it is likely that the milecastle acted as a customs post to levy taxation on that traffic.

A system of milecastles (known as milefortlets) and intervening stone watchtowers extended from the western end of Hadrian's Wall, along the Cumbrian coast as far as Tower 25B at Flimby, but they were linked by a wooden palisade and not a wall fronted by a deep ditch, and they had no gateway through the palisade.

Terminology and numbering
The term milecastle was formalised by Robert Smith in 1708, but was in informal use by locals before that date. It generally refers to the installations attached to the curtain wall, with the term 'Milefortlet' being widely used to refer to similar installations that continued along the Cumbrian coast and were contemporary with the Milecastles. Turrets standing between milefortlets are referred to as towers.

Milecastles are numbered from 1 (the easternmost Milecastle) to 80 in the West. This system was introduced by J. Collingwood Bruce at the end of the 19th century, and became a standard around 1930, though Peter Hill has suggested that there may have additionally been a Milecastle 0. Milefortlets are numbered from 1 (West of Bowness on Solway) possibly as far as 26 (at Flimby). The widely used shorthand is, for example, 'MC1', 'MC2', etc. for Milecastles and 'MF1', 'MF2', etc. for Milefortlets. Intervening Turrets and Towers are referred to with an alphabetic suffix, so the turrets to the West of MC20 would be Turrets 20a and 20b, or 'T20a' and 'T20b'. Despite evidence of the curtain wall continuing for around a quarter of a mile west of Bowness-on-Solway, the Turrets between MC80 and MF1 are known as Towers 0a and 0b.

Where the Turf Wall and Stone Walls diverge from one another (just to the west of Birdoswald), Milecastles and Turrets unique to the Turf Wall are given a 'TW' suffix, for example 'MC50 TW'.

Milecastle plans

Gateways
The milecastles of Hadrian's Wall are recognised as having three principal types of gateway:

Type I have piers protruding symmetrically on the inside and outside of the gateway, with responds on both the inside and outside. The piers and passage-walls tend to be in large masonry, and the structure is broader (E to W) than it is deep (N to S, i.e. between the gateways). Examples are MC 38 (Hotbank) and MC 42 (Cawfields). Generally thought to have been built by Legio II Augusta.
Type II have piers protruding on the inside of the gateway, with responds on outside. The piers and passage-walls tend to be in smaller masonry than Type I. Only found on Narrow Wall milecastles; when similar gateways are found on Broad Wall milecastles, it is sometimes referred to as Type IV. An example is MC 9 (Chapel House). Generally thought to have been built by Legio XX Valeria Victrix.
Type III have piers protruding on the inside of the gateway, with responds on both the inside and outside. The piers tend to be in large masonry and the passage-walls in smaller material. Examples are MC 47 (Chapel House, E of Gilsland) and MC 48 (Poltross Burn). Generally thought to have been built by Legio VI Victrix.

Axes
Two types of milecastle are discernible in plan. These are known as 'Long Axis' and 'Short Axis', with the referred axis being that between the northern and southern gateways. The only (known) exception is Milecastle 79, which was a Turf Wall milecastle subsequently rebuilt with stone.

Gateway Type I – Short-axis milecastles built by legio II Augusta
Gateway Types II and IV – long-axis milecastles built by legio XX Valeria Victrix
Gateway Type III – Long-axis milecastles built by legio VI Victrix

Possible structure
The following are example impressions of what a milecastle might have looked like, created in SketchUp and modeled around Housesteads Milecastle (Milecastle 37).

The sketchup file is available at (http://sketchup.google.com/3dwarehouse/details?mid=97274e6b66c697cabd1b68f4d1016153&prevstart=0).

List of milecastles

References

External links

 
Roman sites in Northumberland